Lukyan is a variant of the Latin masculine given name Lucian.  It means 'light', or 'bringer of light'. It is also used as a given name in Russian, and sometimes a surname.

People named Lukyan

 Lukyan Popov, Russian painter
 Lukyan Stepanovich Streshnyov (~1582–1630), nobleman from Mozhaysk
 Lukyan Kami Traylor (born 1996), athlete from Illinois

Lukyan in fiction
Lukyan Judasson, creator of The Way of Cross and Dragon, a fictional religious text in the novel of the same name by George R. R. Martin.

References

Russian masculine given names